The Sacred Cenote ("sacred well"; alternatively known as the "Well of Sacrifice") is a water-filled sinkhole in limestone at the pre-Columbian Maya archaeological site of Chichen Itza, in the northern Yucatán Peninsula. It is located to the north of Chichen Itza's civic precinct, to which it is connected by a  sacbe, a raised pathway.

According to both Maya and Spanish post-Conquest sources, pre-Columbian Maya deposited valuables and human bodies into the cenote as a form of sacrifice to the rain god Chaac.

Edward Herbert Thompson dredged the Cenote Sagrado from 1904 to 1910, and recovered artifacts of gold, jade, pottery, and incense, as well as human remains. Beginning in the 1950s several Mexican-driven projects were conducted in the cenote, including a 1961 project that used an airlift dredge.

Description and history
The northwestern Yucatán Peninsula is a limestone plain, with no rivers or streams, lakes or ponds. The region is pockmarked with natural sinkholes, called cenotes, which expose the water table to the surface.

According to sources, the Sacred Cenote was a place of pilgrimage for ancient Maya people who would conduct sacrifices into it. As Friar Diego de Landa observed in 1566 after visiting Chichen Itza:

"Into this well they have had, and then had, the custom of throwing men alive as a sacrifice to the gods, in times of drought, and they believed that they did not die though they never saw them again. They also threw into it a great many other things, like precious stones and things which they prized. And so, if this country had possessed gold, it would be this well that would have the great part of it."

Archaeological explorations of the cenote

Edward Herbert Thompson

Most of the major findings in the cenote were made under the supervision of Edward Herbert Thompson, who began dredging in 1904. Much of what is known about the dredging process is derived from Thompson’s personal notes. Thompson received money from Stephen Salisbury III to help him buy the Chichén Itzá excavation site and explore the cenote. Much of Thompson’s findings and research can be found at the Peabody Museum at Harvard University.

A bucket attached to a pulley system was used to dredge the cenote. Much of the beginning work consisted of clearing debris and fallen trees on the top of the water. Leon Cole, a colleague of Thompson, once recorded in his journal, “they made ten hauls in the morning and six or eight in the afternoon.” People would search through the buckets of water looking for artifacts and categorizing them accordingly. Unfortunately, there were several reports of stolen artifacts that could never be found.

Thompson decided to take a break from dredging after Salisbury died. A host of problems, including the Mexican Revolution, and financial issues began to hinder the work effort and damage the morale of the workers. Thompson’s house in Mexico was also burned down, and one of the chests in which he kept his notes and data was destroyed in the fire. By 1923, Thompson was officially done working on the cenote.

Diving in the cenote
In 1909, Thompson decided to dive in the cenote to explore the floors, assisted by two Greek divers from the Bahamas. He reported limited visibility due to the murky water, and many shifting rocks and trees made the dive hazardous. He described the bottom as, “full of long narrow cracks, radiating from centers as if the glass bottom of a dish had been broken by a pointed instrument. We found down in the cracks and holes a grayish mud in which were imbedded the heavier gold objects, jades, and copper bells in numbers.” He later proudly proclaimed, “I have at last personally trod the bottom of the Cenote.”

Exploration under the Mexican authorities
In 1961, the Instituto Nacional de Antropologia e Historia (INAH) in conjunction with the National Geographic Society and Club de Exploraciones y Deportes Acauticos de Mexico (CEDAM) conducted another expedition into the cenote. Some of the notable discoveries included an inscribed, gold-sheathed bone, a large chert knife with a gold-sheathed wooden handle, and wooden ear flares with jade and turquoise mosaic.

In 1967-1968, Norman Scott and Román Piña Chán led another expedition. They tried two new methods that many people had suggested for a long time: emptying the water out of the cenote and clarifying the water. Both of these methods were only partially successful.

Objects found in the Sacred Cenote
Archaeological investigations have removed thousands of objects from the bottom of the cenote, including artifacts made from gold, jadeite, copal, pottery, flint, obsidian, shell, wood, rubber, and cloth, as well as human skeletons.

Many perishable objects were preserved by the cenote. Wooden objects which normally would have rotted were preserved in the water. A great variety of wooden objects have been found including weapons, scepters, idols, tools, and jewelry. Jade was the largest category of objects found, followed by textiles. The presence of jade, gold and copper in the cenote offers proof of the importance of Chichén Itzá as a cultural city center.

None of these raw materials are native to the Yucatán, which indicates that they were valuable objects brought to Chichén Itzá from other places in Central America and then sacrificed as an act of worship. Pottery, stone, bone and shells were also found in the cenote. Archaeologists have found that many objects show evidence of being intentionally damaged before being thrown into the cenote, and have speculated that this intentional damage is meant to be analogous to “killing” the object as a sacrifice.

Human sacrifice

Certain cenotes contain a large number of human remains, including both males and females, and young children/infants. Evidence from Maya mythology suggests that many young victims (most aged 6 to 12) were male (de Anda, 2007). While the classical images of a female Maya sacrifice being flung alive to drown in a cenote are pervasive, de Anda's (2007) writings on the subject suggest that most sacrificial victims — juveniles who were either purchased or captured while their parents were working in the fields, warriors captured in battle, or elites captured during conflicts with neighboring clans — were usually (though not always) killed prior to being thrown into the cenote, and in many cases, dozens of miles from the cenotes in which their bodies were eventually deposited.  Only a certain set of cenotes were used in this way, while others were reserved for domestic purposes (de Anda 2007). This suggests that Maya religious officiants believed that only certain cenotes led to the underworld, and sacrifices placed in others would serve no purpose. It also suggests that the status of the victim as alive or dead was unimportant. The occasional appearance of human remains in non-sacrificial cenotes can be attributed to rare errors in judgement on the part of the shaman. The actual pattern by which a particular victim's remains became interred in which cenotes remains a point of conjecture.

The Franciscan leader Diego de Landa reported that he witnessed live sacrifices being thrown into the cenote at Chichén Itzá. However, his account does not indicate the regularity of this behavior.

See also
 Ik Kil, nearby cenote
 List of sinkholes of Mexico

Notes

Bibliography

External links

 Cenotes of Chichén Itzá

Chichen Itza
Natural history of Yucatán
Sinkholes of Mexico
Holy wells
Religious places of the indigenous peoples of North America
Sacred lakes
Landforms of Yucatán
Human sacrifice
Karst lakes